Diane J. Mathis is the Morton Grove-Rasmussen chair of immunohematology at Harvard Medical School. She has been recognized for her research with elections to the National Academy of Sciences and American Academy of Arts and Sciences.

Education 
Mathis received her BS from Wake Forest University and her PhD from the University of Rochester. She did postdoctoral research at the Laboratoire de Génétique Moléculaire des Eucaryotes in Strasbourg, France, and at Stanford University Medical Center.

Career 
Mathis returned to the Institut de Genetique et de Biologie Moleculaire et Cellulaire in France, and established a lab in collaboration with Christophe Benoist. Mathis and Benoist moved their lab to the Joslin Diabetes Center in Boston in 1999. In 2009, she joined the department of pathology at Harvard Medical School, where she and Benoist continue to operate a joint lab. She is currently the Morton Grove-Rasmussen chair of immunohematology there, and an associate member of the Broad Institute.

Her research focuses on T cell tolerance and autoimmunity, particularly as it applies to the development of type I diabetes.

Mathis was elected to the National Academy of Sciences in 2003 and the American Academy of Arts and Sciences in 2012. Columbia University recognized her contributions to the understanding of type I diabetes with the 2012 Naomi Berrie Award.  In 2017, she received the FASEB Excellence in Science Award.
 Rabbi Shai Shaknai Award (2018)

References 

Members of the United States National Academy of Sciences
Fellows of the American Academy of Arts and Sciences
Harvard Medical School faculty
University of Rochester alumni
Wake Forest University alumni
American immunologists
Living people
Year of birth missing (living people)